Carlos Castañeda (December 25, 1925 – April 27, 1998) was an American writer. Starting with The Teachings of Don Juan in 1968, Castaneda wrote a series of books that purport to describe training in shamanism that he received under the tutelage of a Yaqui "Man of Knowledge" named don Juan Matus.

Castaneda's first three books—The Teachings of Don Juan: A Yaqui Way of Knowledge, A Separate Reality, and Journey to Ixtlan—were written while he was an anthropology student at the University of California, Los Angeles (UCLA). He wrote that these books were ethnographic accounts describing his apprenticeship with a traditional "Man of Knowledge" identified as don Juan Matus, a Yaqui Indian from northern Mexico. The veracity of these books was doubted from their original publication, and they are now widely considered to be fictional. Castaneda was awarded his bachelor's and doctoral degrees based on the work described in these books.
 
At the time of his death in 1998, Castaneda's books had sold more than eight million copies and had been published in 17 languages.

Early life
According to his birth record, Carlos Castañeda was born Carlos César Salvador Arana, on December 25, 1925, in Cajamarca, Peru, son of César Arana and Susana Castañeda, both of them single. Immigration records confirm the birth record's date and place of birth. Castaneda moved to the United States in 1951 and became a naturalized citizen on June 21, 1957.

Career
Castaneda's first three books—The Teachings of Don Juan: A Yaqui Way of Knowledge, A Separate Reality, and Journey to Ixtlan—were written while he was an anthropology student at the University of California, Los Angeles (UCLA). He wrote that these books were ethnographic accounts describing his apprenticeship with a traditional "Man of Knowledge" identified as don Juan Matus, an Indigenous Yaqui from northern Mexico. The veracity of these books was doubted from their original publication, and they are now widely considered to be fictional. Castaneda was awarded his bachelor's and doctoral degrees based on the work described in these books.

In 1974 his fourth book, Tales of Power, chronicled the end of his apprenticeship with Matus. Castaneda continued to be popular with the reading public, and subsequent publications appeared describing further aspects of his training with don Juan.

Castaneda wrote that don Juan recognized him as the new nagual, or leader of a party of seers of his lineage. Matus also used the term nagual to signify that part of perception which is in the realm of the unknown yet still reachable by man—implying that, for his own party of seers, Matus was a connection to that unknown. Castaneda often referred to this unknown realm as "nonordinary reality."

While Castaneda was a well-known cultural figure, he rarely appeared in public forums. He was the subject of a cover article in the March 5, 1973, issue of Time, which described him as "an enigma wrapped in a mystery wrapped in a tortilla". There was controversy when it was revealed that Castaneda might have used a surrogate for his cover portrait. Correspondent Sandra Burton, apparently unaware of Castaneda's principle of freedom from personal history, confronted him about discrepancies in his account of his life. He responded: "To ask me to verify my life by giving you my statistics ... is like using science to validate sorcery. It robs the world of its magic and makes milestones out of us all."  Following that interview, Castaneda completely retired from public view until the 1990s.

Don Juan Matus
Scholars have debated "whether Castaneda actually served as an apprentice to the alleged Yaqui sorcerer don Juan Matus or if he invented the whole odyssey." Castaneda's books are classified as non-fiction by their publisher, although there is consensus among critics that they are largely, if not completely, fictional.

Author and Castaneda critic Richard de Mille published two books—Castaneda's Journey: The Power and the Allegory and The Don Juan Papers—in which he argued that don Juan was imaginary, based on a number of arguments, including that Castaneda did not report on the Yaqui name of a single plant he learned about, and that he and don Juan "go quite unmolested by pests that normally torment desert hikers." Castaneda's Journey also includes 47 pages of quotes Castaneda attributed to don Juan which were actually from a variety of other sources, including anthropological journal articles and even well known writers like Ludwig Wittgenstein and C. S. Lewis. De Mille's work has also come under criticism of its own, however. Walter Shelburne contends that "the Don Juan chronicle cannot be a literally true account."

According to Jay Fikes's research in Mexico, Castaneda spent some time with Ramón Medina Silva, a Huichol mara'akame (shaman) and artist who may have inspired the don Juan character. Silva was murdered during a brawl in 1971.

Tensegrity

In the 1990s, Castaneda once again began appearing in public to promote Tensegrity, described in promotional materials as "the modernized version of some movements called magical passes developed by Indigenous shamans who lived in Mexico in times prior to the Spanish conquest."

Castaneda, with Carol Tiggs, Florinda Donner-Grau and Taisha Abelar, created Cleargreen Incorporated in 1995, whose stated purpose was "to sponsor Tensegrity workshops, classes and publications.". Tensegrity seminars, books, and other merchandise were sold through Cleargreen.

Personal life
Castaneda married Margaret Runyan in Mexico in 1960, according to Runyan's memoirs. He is listed as the father on the birth certificate of Runyan's son C.J. Castaneda, even though the biological father was a different man.

In an interview, Runyan said she and Castaneda were married from 1960 to 1973; however, Castaneda obscured whether the marriage occurred, and his death certificate stated he had never been married.

Death
Castaneda died on April 27, 1998 in Los Angeles due to complications from hepatocellular cancer. There was no public service; he was cremated and the ashes were sent to Mexico. His death was unknown to the outside world until nearly two months later, on June 19, 1998, when an obituary, "A Hushed Death for Mystic Author Carlos Castaneda" by staff writer J. R. Moehringer appeared in the Los Angeles Times.

Four months after Castaneda's death, C. J. Castaneda, also known as Adrian Vashon, whose birth certificate shows Carlos Castaneda as his father, challenged the authenticity of Castaneda's will in probate court. The challenge was ultimately unsuccessful. Carlos' death certificate states metabolic encephalopathy for 72 hours prior to his death, yet the will was purportedly signed 48hours before Castaneda's death.

Castaneda's students
After Castaneda stepped away from public view in 1973, he bought a large multi-dwelling property in Los Angeles which he shared with some of his followers, including Taisha Abelar (formerly Maryann Simko) and Florinda Donner-Grau (formerly Regine Thal). Like Castaneda, Abelar and Donner-Grau were students of anthropology at UCLA. Each subsequently wrote books about their experiences of Castaneda's teachings from a feminist perspective that Castaneda endorsed as authentic.

Around the time Castaneda died, his companions Donner-Grau, Abelar and Patricia Partin informed friends they were leaving on a long journey. Amalia Marquez (also known as Talia Bey) and Tensegrity instructor Kylie Lundahl also left Los Angeles. Weeks later, Partin's red Ford Escort was found abandoned in Death Valley. Luis Marquez, Bey's brother, went to police in 1999 over his sister's disappearance, but could not convince them that it merited investigation.

In 2003, Partin's sun-bleached skeleton was discovered by a pair of hikers in Death Valley's Panamint Dunes area and identified in 2006 by DNA testing. The investigating authorities ruled the cause of death as undetermined. However, Castaneda often talked about suicide, and associates believe the women killed themselves in the wake of Castaneda's death.

Reception

Early responses
The veracity of Castaneda's work has been doubted since their original publication, even while reviewers praised the writing and storytelling. For example, while Edmund Leach praised The Teachings of Don Juan as "a work of art," he doubted its factual authenticity. Anthropologist E. H. Spicer offered a somewhat mixed review of the book, highlighting Castaneda's expressive prose and his vivid depiction of his relationship with don Juan. However, Spicer noted that the events described in the book were not consistent with other ethnographic accounts of Yaqui cultural practices, concluding it was unlikely that don Juan had ever participated in Yaqui group life. Spicer also wrote, "[It is] wholly gratuitous to emphasize, as the subtitle does, any connection between the subject matter of the book and the cultural traditions of the Yaquis."

In a series of articles, R. Gordon Wasson, the ethnobotanist who made psychoactive mushrooms famous, similarly praised Castaneda's work, while expressing doubts regarding some of the claims' accuracy.

An early unpublished review by anthropologist Weston La Barre was more critical. He questioned the book's accuracy, calling it a "pseudo-profound deeply vulgar pseudo-ethnography." The review, initially commissioned by The New York Times Book Review, was rejected and replaced by a more positive review from anthropologist Paul Riesman.

More pointed criticism
Beginning in 1976, Richard de Mille published a series of criticisms that uncovered inconsistencies in Castaneda's field notes, as well as 47 pages of apparently plagiarized quotes.

Those familiar with Yaqui culture also questioned Castaneda's accounts, including anthropologist Jane Holden Kelley. Other criticisms of Castaneda's work include the total lack of Yaqui vocabulary or terms for any of his experiences, and his refusal to defend himself against the accusation that he received his PhD from UCLA through deception.

John Dedrick, a Protestant missionary who lived among the Yaqui Indians of Vicam, Sonora, from 1940 to 1979 said that, "I've only read The Teachings of Don Juan, and before I got to the third part of the book I knew that he [Castaneda] did know of the Yaquis and that he had not been to the Rio Yaqui river, or that there is no terminology in the Yaqui language for any of the instructions and explanations that "Don Juan" was giving it to him [Castaneda].

Modern perspectives
According to William W. Kelly, chair of the anthropology department at Yale University:I doubt you'll find an anthropologist of my generation who regards Castaneda as anything but a clever con man. It was a hoax, and surely don Juan never existed as anything like the figure of his books. Perhaps to many it is an amusing footnote to the gullibility of naive scholars, although to me it remains a disturbing and unforgivable breach of ethics.David Silverman sees value in the work even while considering it fictional. In Reading Castaneda he describes the apparent deception as a critique of anthropology field work in general—a field that relies heavily on personal experience, and necessarily views other cultures through a lens. He said that the descriptions of peyote trips and the work's fictional nature were meant to place doubt on other works of anthropology.

Donald Wieve cites Castaneda to explain the insider/outsider problem as it relates to mystical experiences, while acknowledging the fictional nature of Castaneda's work.

Related authors and influence

Octavio Paz, Nobel laureate, poet, and diplomat. Paz wrote the prolog to the Spanish language edition of The Teachings of Don Juan.
Michael Korda, editor-in-chief at Simon & Schuster, was Castaneda's editor for his first eight books and discusses their work together in an essay in Another Life: A Memoir of Other People.
George Lucas has stated that Yoda and Luke Skywalker were inspired in part by don Juan and Castaneda.
Amy Wallace wrote Sorcerer's Apprentice: My Life with Carlos Castaneda, an account of her personal experiences with Castaneda and his followers.
Brazilian writer Lui Morais analyzes Castaneda's work, its cultural implications, and its continuation in other authors in Carlos Castaneda e a Fenda entre os Mundos: Vislumbres da Filosofia Ānahuacah no Século XXI.

Bibliography

Books
The Teachings of Don Juan: A Yaqui Way of Knowledge, 1968. . (Summer 1960 to October 1965.)
A Separate Reality: Further Conversations with Don Juan, 1971. . (April 1968 to October 1970.)
Journey to Ixtlan: The Lessons of Don Juan, 1972. . (Summer 1960 to May 1971.)
Tales of Power, 1974. . (Autumn 1971 to the 'Final Meeting' with don Juan Matus in 1973.)
The Second Ring of Power, 1977. . (Meeting his fellow apprentices after the 'Final Meeting'.)
The Eagle's Gift, 1981. . (Continuing with his fellow apprentices; and then alone with La Gorda.)
The Fire From Within, 1984. . (Don Juan's 'Second Attention' teachings through to the 'Final Meeting' in 1973.)
The Power of Silence: Further Lessons of Don Juan, 1987. . (The 'Abstract Cores' of don Juan's lessons.)
The Art of Dreaming, 1993. . (Review of don Juan's lessons in dreaming.)
Magical Passes: The Practical Wisdom of the Shamans of Ancient Mexico, 1998. . (Body movements for breaking the barriers of normal perception.)
The Wheel of Time: Shamans of Ancient Mexico, Their Thoughts About Life, Death and the Universe, 1998. . (Selected quotations from the first eight books.)
The Active Side of Infinity, 1999. . (Memorable events of his life.)

Interviews
Burton, Sandra (March 5, 1973). "Magic and Reality". Time.
Corvalan, Graciela, Der Weg der Tolteken - Ein Gespräch mit Carlos Castañeda, Fischer, 1987, c. 100p.,

See also
 Neoshamanism
 New Age
 Peyote song
 Rainbow body

References

Notes

Citations

Works cited
 

Critical works

Works by students

Further reading
  Background on Julio Cesar Arana, despotic rubber baron, Carlos Castaneda's paternal grandfather.

Critical works

Parodies

 Republished in:

External links

transcript: Carlos Castaneda Interviewed by Jane Hellisoe of the University of California Press, 1968, UCLA
youtube audio: Carlos Castaneda Interviewed by Jane Hellisoe of the University of California Press, 1968, UCLA

 
1925 births
1998 deaths
20th-century American writers
20th-century American anthropologists
American spiritual writers
Naturalized citizens of the United States
Peruvian emigrants to the United States
People from Cajamarca
Shamanism of the Americas
University of California, Los Angeles alumni
Deaths from cancer in California
Deaths from liver cancer